Joseph John Matijevic (born November 14, 1995) is an American professional baseball first baseman for the Houston Astros of Major League Baseball (MLB). He made his MLB debut in 2022.

Amateur career
Matijevic attended Norwin High School in North Huntingdon, Pennsylvania, where he played baseball and basketball. The Boston Red Sox selected him as a shortstop in the 22nd round of the 2014 MLB Draft. He did not sign and enrolled at the University of Arizona, where he played college baseball for the Arizona Wildcats. In 2015 and 2016, Matijevic played collegiate summer baseball with the Falmouth Commodores of the Cape Cod Baseball League, where he was named a league all-star in 2015.

Professional career

Minor leagues
The Houston Astros selected Matijevic with the 75th overall selection of the 2017 MLB Draft. He signed with the Astros, receiving a $700,000 signing bonus, and was assigned to the Tri-City ValleyCats of the Class A-Short Season New York-Penn League, where he began his professional career. Matijevic was promoted to the  Quad Cities River Bandits of the Class A Midwest League in August. In 59 games between the two teams, he hit .228 with seven home runs, 31 RBIs, and 11 stolen bases.

Matijevic began 2018 with Quad Cities. In May, the Astros promoted him to the Buies Creek Astros of the Class A-Advanced Carolina League. In 101 games between both teams, he hit .277/.350/.538 with 22 home runs and 62 RBIs. He began 2019 with the Corpus Christi Hooks of the Class AA Texas League. On April 30, Matijevic received a 50-game suspension after failing a second test for a drug violation. He was selected to play in the Arizona Fall League for the Peoria Javelinas following the season.

Matijevic did not play in a game in 2020 due to the cancellation of the minor league season because of the COVID-19 pandemic. He split the 2021 season between Corpus Christi and the Triple-A Sugar Land Skeeters, slashing .254/.341/.512 with 25 home runs and 75 RBI in 109 total games.

The Astros invited Matijevic to Spring Training in 2022.  He did not make the team at the outset of the season and was assigned to Triple-A Sugar Land, who had rebranded as the Sugar Land Space Cowboys.  He began the season batting .310 (13-for-42), .420 OBP, .714 SLG, 1.134 OPS, with four home runs, and 10 RBI over 11 games.

Houston Astros
After a hamstring injury to José Altuve, the Astros called up Matijevic from Sugar Land on April 20, 2022.  He made his major league debut on April 22 versus the Toronto Blue Jays, as a pinch hitter in the ninth inning of a 4–3 loss.  Matijevic struck out in his lone at bat.  He received his first career start in the major leagues on April 27, 2022, manning first base versus the Texas Rangers.
On June 19, 2022, Matijevic recorded his first major league hit, a home run, against the Chicacgo White Sox starter Michael Kopech, which landed in the Crawford Box seats at Minute Maid Park in a 4–3 Astros' win.  In the bottom of the ninth inning versus the New York Yankees on July 21, Matijevic hit a walk-off infield single with the bases loaded to score Alex Bregman for a 3–2 win .

See also

 List of University of Arizona people

References

External links

1995 births
Living people
People from Latrobe, Pennsylvania
American people of Slavic descent
Sportspeople from the Pittsburgh metropolitan area
Baseball players from Pennsylvania
Major League Baseball first basemen
Major League Baseball outfielders
Houston Astros players
Arizona Wildcats baseball players
Falmouth Commodores players
Tri-City ValleyCats players
Quad Cities River Bandits players
Buies Creek Astros players
Fayetteville Woodpeckers players
Corpus Christi Hooks players
Peoria Javelinas players
Sugar Land Skeeters players
Sugar Land Space Cowboys players